Abby Wambach is a retired professional soccer player who competed as a forward for the United States women's national soccer team from 2001 to 2015. In 255 appearances for the senior national team, she scored 184 goals and is second in the world for goals scored at the international level by both female and male soccer players. The previous record holder was Mia Hamm who scored 158 international goals during her career, also for the United States. Wambach broke Hamm's record on June 20, 2013, as she completed a hat trick against South Korea, in a friendly match at Red Bull Arena in Harrison, New Jersey.

Wambach scored her first international goal in the seventh minute of a friendly against Finland on April 27, 2002, in her second game for the national team. She scored her first international hat trick during a friendly against Scotland leading the national team to an 8–2 win in her fourth appearance for the team. Her first international goal scored during a competitive match occurred on November 2, 2002, during the national team's 9–0 win over Panama in the 2002 CONCACAF Women's Gold Cup. During her first FIFA Women's World Cup tournament, she scored three goals in six games. Wambach completed her international career having scored a total of 14 goals in her 25 World Cup match appearances, placing second on the all-time World Cup scoring list behind Marta.

Known for scoring goals with diving headers, one of her more notable goals occurred in the 122nd minute of the 2011 FIFA Women's World Cup quarterfinal match against Brazil from a last-minute cross from midfielder Megan Rapinoe. Wambach scored the equalizer in stoppage time and the Americans defeated Brazil in a penalty shootout. The team eventually progressed to the World Cup final against Japan. Wambach's last-minute goal set a new record for the latest goal ever scored in a World Cup match and was awarded ESPN's 2011 ESPY Award for Best Play of the Year. Following her performance at the 2011 World Cup, Wambach was awarded the tournament's Bronze Boot and Silver Ball. In 2011, she became the first ever soccer player of any gender to be named Associated Press Athlete of the Year.

International goals
"Score" represents the score in the match after Wambach's goal. "Score" and "Result" list the United States' goal tally first. Cap represents the player's appearance in an international level match.

Statistics

See also

 List of women's footballers with 100 or more international goals
 List of footballers with 100 or more caps

References

External links
 Statistical Breakdown of Wambach's Goals (U.S. Soccer Federation) 

United States women's national soccer team
Wambach
Women's association football records and statistics
Wambach goals